Elliott is a ghost town in San Joaquin County, in the U.S. state of California.

History
The first settlement at Elliott was made in 1846. A post office called Elliott was established in 1863, and remained in operation until 1901.

References

Geography of San Joaquin County, California
Ghost towns in California